The boys' singles badminton event at the 2014 Summer Youth Olympics were held at Nanjing Sport Institute. The 32 qualified athletes were split into 8 groups, with four players each. In their groups, they play a one-way round-robin and the first of each group qualifies to the quarterfinals, where they play a knock-out stage until the medal matches.

Group play

Groups

Results

Group A

Group B

Group C

Group D

Group E

Group F

Group G

Group H

Knockout stage

References
Aug 17, 2014 results
Aug 18, 2014 results
Aug 19, 2014 results
Aug 20, 2014 results
Aug 21, 2014 results
Aug 22, 2014 results

Badminton at the 2014 Summer Youth Olympics